Buret may refer to:
Burette laboratory equipment

surname
Isabelle Buret
Maurice Buret

toponymy
Le Buret, France
Buret District, a former district of Kenya
Buret', archaeological site in Siberia